This discography documents albums and singles released by American recording artist Roberta Flack.

Albums

Studio albums

 First Take reached its peak position in 1972.

Live albums

Soundtrack albums

Compilation albums

Singles

Guest appearances
With Les McCann
Comment (Atlantic, 1970)

References

Rhythm and blues discographies
Discographies of American artists
Soul music discographies